The term Chinese pyramids refers to pyramidal shaped structures in China, most of which are ancient mausoleums and burial mounds built to house the remains of several early emperors of China and their imperial relatives. The most famous is the Mausoleum of the First Qin Emperor, northeast of Xi'an and 1.7 km west of where the Terracotta Army was found.

Earliest tombs
The earliest tombs in China are found just north of Beijing in the Inner Mongolia Autonomous Region and in Liaoning. They belong to the Neolithic Hongshan culture (4700 to 2900 BC).

The site of Niuheliang in Liaoning contains a pyramidal structure.

Information available in the West 

In 1667 the Jesuit Father Athanasius Kircher wrote about Chinese pyramids in his book China monumentis Illustrata.

The existence of "pyramids" in China remained little known in the Western world until the 1910s. They were documented in large numbers around Xian, first in 1912 by the Western traders Fred Meyer Schroder and Oscar Mamen, and also in 1913 by the expedition of Victor Segalen. He wrote about the First Emperor's tomb, and about the other mound tombs in the region in his Mission archéologique en Chine (1914): L'art funéraire à l'époque des Han.

Sensational claims
The introduction of pyramids in China to popular attention came soon after World War II. Many early stories were focused on the existence of a "Great White Pyramid" (Maoling). This is the tomb of Emperor Wu of Han (156–87 BC) located in Xingping, Shaanxi Province.

U.S. Army Air Corps pilot James Gaussman is said to have seen a white jewel-topped pyramid during a flight between India and China during World War II. Colonel Maurice Sheahan, Far Eastern director of the Trans World Airline, gave an eyewitness account of his encounter with a pyramid in the March 28, 1947 edition of The New York Times.  A photo of Sheahan's pyramid appeared in The New York Sunday News on March 30, 1947. This photograph later became attributed to James Gaussman.

Chris Maier showed that the pyramid in the photo is the Maoling Mausoleum of Emperor Wu just outside Xi'an. Pseudohistorians, through promoting their theories, have increased western awareness of these pyramids. Hartwig Hausdorf speculated it was built by aliens, and Philip Coppens repeated this theory.

Despite claims to the contrary, the existence of these pyramid-shaped tomb mounds was known by scientists in the West before the publicity caused by the story in 1947. Shortly after the New York Times story, Science News Letter (now Science News) published a short item saying: "The Chinese pyramids of that region are built of mud and dirt and are more like mounds than the pyramids of Egypt, and the region is little travelled.

Some of the pyramids of Xi'an are currently tourist attractions, such as for example the Han Yang Ling Mausoleum of the Western Han Dynasty, and several of them have museums attached to them.

Partial list of mausoleums and tombs in China

Zhou dynasty tombs complex near Luoyang, Henan
 Tomb of King Ling of Zhou 
 Tomb of Three Kings of Zhou

Zhao Kings' tombs complex near Handan, Hebei
 Tomb of King of Zhao state

Yan King's burial mounds in Yixian, Hebei
 Burial complex in ancient Xiadu

Qin dynasty mausoleums near Xi'an, Shaanxi
 Tomb of First Emperor in Lintong  .This is the largest Chinese burial mound. It was built during the short-lived imperial Qin Dynasty (221–206 BCE).
 Tomb of Emperor Qin Ershi in Xi'an.

Western Han dynasty mausoleums complex in Xianyang and around Xi'an, Shaanxi
Maoling Mausoleum group:
 Tomb of Emperor Wu of Han . The size is  x .
 Tomb of Empress Li 
 Tomb of Princess Yang Xin

Pingling Mausoleum group:
 Tomb of Emperor Zhao of Han 
 Tomb of Empress Shangguan 

Yanling Mausoleum group:
 Tomb of Emperor Cheng of Han 
 Tomb of Empress Xu 
 Tomb of Consort Ban 
 Tomb of Empress Zhao Feiyan

Kangling Mausoleum group:
 Tomb of Emperor Ping of Han 
 Tomb of Empress Wang

Weiling Mausoleum group:
 Tomb of Emperor Yuan of Han 
 Tomb of Empress Wang 

Group of two "tombs of Zhou Kings" (possibly from Han era):
 Tomb of King Wu of Zhou
 Tomb of King Wen of Zhou

Yiling mausoleum group:
 Tomb of Emperor Ai of Han 
 Tomb of Empress Fu 

Anling mausoleum group:
 Tomb of Emperor Hui of Han 
 Tomb of Empress Zhang Yan 
 Tomb of Marquis Zhang Ao (father of Empress Zhang Yan) 
 Tomb of Princess Lu of Yuan (mother of Empress Zhang Yan)

Changling mausoleum group:
 Tomb of Emperor Gaozu of Han 
 Tomb of Empress Lü 
 Tomb of Consort Qi

Yangling mausoleum group:
 Tomb of Emperor Jing of Han 
 Tomb of Empress Wang 

Baling mausoleum group:
 Tomb of Emperor Wen of Han (The tomb of the Emperor himself does not feature a pyramidal mound, due to his death wish)
 Tomb of Empress Dou 
 Tomb of Empress Dowager Bo 

Duling mausoleum group:
 Tomb of Emperor Xuan of Han 
 Tomb of Empress Wang 
 Tomb of Empress Xu

Eastern Han mausoleums near Luoyang, Henan

Yangling, Shaanxi
 Tomb of Emperor Wen of Sui

Xining, Qinghai
 The Lianhu Altar (凉虎台)

Tang dynasty mausoleums in Shaanxi
The eighteen mausoleums of the Tang Dynasty emperors (唐十八陵) in the valley of the Wei River north of the Qin Mountains (秦岭). Most are natural hills shaped by man, and they are among the biggest Chinese mausoleums, such as Qianling (乾陵), joint tomb of Emperor Gaozong of Tang and of the Empress Wu Zetian. Some mausoleums feature a burial mound:
 Chongling Mausoleum of Emperor Dezong of Tang
 Jinling Mausoleum of Emperor Xianzong of Tang
 Tomb of Princess Chengyang of Emperor Taizong 
 Tomb of Princess Xincheng of Emperor Taizong

Mausoleum of Emperor Xiaojing of Tang near Goushi, Henan
 Tomb of Emperor Xiaojing of Tang 
 Tomb of Empress Ai

Imperial mausoleums complex of Song dynasty in and around Gongyi, Henan

Elsewhere
 Shou Qiu in Qufu, Shandong – a small pyramidal monument believed to be the birthplace of the Yellow Emperor, located adjacent to the Shaohao Tomb
 Janggun-chong (Jiangjunzhong 將軍塚) Step Pyramid in Jilin, "Tomb of the General", is supposed to be the mausoleum of King Jangsu (Ko. 장수왕 Ch. 長壽王) (413–491), king of Goguryeo, an ancient Korean kingdom. It belongs to the Capital Cities and Tombs of the Ancient Koguryo Kingdom on the World heritage list. Nearby is the Taewang-neung / Taiwangling (태왕릉, 太王陵) Pyramid believed to be the burial of King Gwanggaeto the Great (Ko. 광개토태왕; Ch. 廣開土太王) (391–413); while twice bigger than Janggun-chong, it is in bad shape and Janggun-chong is touted as the touristic highpoint of the site.
 Shimao a Neolithic site in Shenmu County, Shaanxi with a large stepped pyramid with palaces at its top and used also for artisan or industrial work

See also
 Chinese architecture

References

External links 

 Niuheliang Archaeological Site
 Center for the Art of East Asia article discussing Western Han pyramidal mounds and Tang Dynasty tombs
 People's Daily – Inner Mongolian pyramid
       Steinhardt, Nancy Shatzman. 1993. The Tangut Royal Tombs near Yinchuan. In Muqarnas X: An Annual on Islamic Art and Architecture. Margaret B. Sevcenko, ed. Leiden: E.J. Brill.
 Google Map – Mount Li Mausoleum (Qin Shi Huang Mausoleum)
 Google Map – Maoling Mausoleum (Great White Pyramid)

Archaeology of China
Pyramids in China
Mausoleums in China
Han dynasty architecture